Rumonge is the capital of Rumonge Province, Burundi, and is located on the shores of Lake Tanganyika. The 2008 census recorded a population of 35,931 in Rumonge, making it Burundi's fourth largest city.  It had a big Arab (Sharji/Azri) presence before Burundi's independence in 1962.

References

Populated places in Rumonge Province